St. Peter's Primary School may refer to:

St. Peter's Primary School, Charlemont, Charlemont, County Armagh, Northern Ireland
St Peter's RC Primary School, Aberdeen, Scotland
St Peter's Boys School, Stewartville St, Glasgow
St Peter's Church of England Primary School, Swinton, Salford, England
, Aberdeen Island, Hong Kong
, Shek Pai Wan Estate, Aberdeen, Hong Kong
, Hill Road, Shek Tong Tsui, Hong Kong

See also
 St Peter's School (disambiguation)